Richard Sawatsky (born February 26, 1976) is a Canadian curler from Kelowna, British Columbia. He currently plays lead on Team Jim Cotter that curls out of the Kelowna Curling Club.

Personal life
Sawatsky is employed as a water meter technician with the city of Kelowna.

Teams

References

External links

1976 births
Curlers from British Columbia
Curlers from Ontario
Living people
People from Sioux Lookout
Sportspeople from Kelowna
Canadian male curlers
Canada Cup (curling) participants